Kurt Schmied (born 3 September 1965) is an Austrian former cyclist. He competed in the team pursuit event at the 1988 Summer Olympics.

References

External links
 

1965 births
Living people
Austrian male cyclists
Olympic cyclists of Austria
Cyclists at the 1988 Summer Olympics
Place of birth missing (living people)